The Munich U-Bahn is an electric rail rapid transit network in Munich, Germany. The system began operation in 1971, and is operated by the municipally owned Münchner Verkehrsgesellschaft (MVG; Munich Transport Company). The network is integrated into the Münchner Verkehrs- und Tarifverbund (MVV; Munich Transport and Tariff Association) and interconnected with the Munich S-Bahn. The U-Bahn currently comprises eight lines, serving 96 stations (100 stations if four interchange stations with separate levels for different lines are counted twice), and encompassing  of routes.

Current routes 

There are eight lines:

The network has  of active route, and 100 stations. In 2014, 390 million passengers rode the U-Bahn. There is no continuous operation during the night (break from 1 to 4 am, 2 to 4 am on weekends) except on special occasions such as New Year's Eve.

Currently, only the U6 line crosses the municipal border to the town of Garching.

Except for the lines U5 and U6, all lines operate completely below ground. U5 only comes above ground at the south terminus Neuperlach-Süd, U6 on the northern section from Studentenstadt (except Garching and Garching-Forschungszentrum stations and tunnels).

There are three "line families", which each consist of two lines (not counting peak hour lines) that share a common track in the city centre. The schedules of these lines are coordinated to produce regular train intervals on the common section.

Most stations have two tracks with an island platform between them. Of the single-line stations, only the stations Olympia-Einkaufszentrum (U1), Richard-Strauss-Straße (U4), Neuperlach Süd (U5), Garching-Hochbrück and Nordfriedhof (both U6) have side platforms.

At the junction stations Scheidplatz and Innsbrucker Ring, the four tracks run in parallel on the same level, with two island platforms allowing cross-platform interchange. The stations Hauptbahnhof (lower level), where U1 and U2 branch into two different lines and Münchner Freiheit (U3/U6) also have four tracks, while Implerstraße (U3/U6), Max-Weber-Platz (U4/U5) and Kolumbusplatz (U1/U2) have three: one with a side platform for outbound trains and two with a shared island platform for inbound trains.

Olympiazentrum, Fröttmaning and Kieferngarten also have four tracks each, due to the proximity of the Olympic Stadium, the Allianz Arena football stadium, and the technical base, respectively.

At Hauptbahnhof, there is a second U-Bahn station for lines U4/5 at a higher level, giving a total of six U-Bahn tracks. Sendlinger Tor, Odeonsplatz and Olympia-Einkaufszentrum also each have two quite separate stations at different levels, connected with each other by escalators and elevators.

Frequency and scheduling 
Most lines operate with trains running at intervals of every 5 minutes during peak hours, but due to lines overlapping, a suitable train for a journey can be as frequent as every 2 minutes. Outside of peak times lines operate trains at frequencies of every 10 minutes; however, around the start of operations and after midnight the line frequency decreases to every 20 minutes or more on most lines. Again with line overlap this means that a suitable train will arrive (often much) more frequently.

U1 

In 1980 the U1 commenced operation together with the U8 (now U2). At the beginning it was only operating on a section of U2's track. When the branch to Rotkreuzplatz was opened, it became a separate line. The line's colour is green.

It starts at Olympia-Einkaufszentrum in the district of Moosach. The U3 was extended to the same station (but on a different level) in 2007. On the way south it follows Hanauer Straße to Georg-Brauchle-Ring, which has been designed by Franz Ackermann, reaching Westfriedhof. It continues via Gern to Rotkreuzplatz, which was its terminus from 1983 to 1998. Below Nymphenburger Straße it goes on to Maillingerstraße and Stiglmaierplatz and finally merges into the U2 track at München Hauptbahnhof.

On the busy city section, U1 and U2 run with a 5-minute offset, yielding 5 minute intervals even beyond peak hours. At Central Station, it also crosses the S-Bahn and U4/U5. At the next station, Sendlinger Tor, it passes below U3/U6. There the U1/U2 platforms for each direction lie in tunnels which are apart from each other and are connected by a pedestrian tunnel.

Fraunhoferstraße, the next station, is also reached in separate tunnels, which had to be excavated using tunneling shields due to the proximity of the River Isar. However, the two tubes are connected by the platform, which demanded large pillars that are characteristic for this station. The next station, Kolumbusplatz, is a junction which has three tracks. Here the U1 branches off the U2 again.

The southbound branch line was opened in 1997 and traverses the colourful station Candidplatz, eventually reaching Wettersteinplatz. The following station, St.-Quirin-Platz has an extraordinary architecture, as it is covered by a large, shell-like structure made from glass and steel, which is drawn nearly down to track level on one side. The U1 terminates at Mangfallplatz below Naupliastraße.

U2 
The route of the U2 line has undergone more changes than any of the other Munich underground lines. It also changed its name as it was first called U8. It is the only line that runs or ran on all three "line families" (U1/U2, U3/U6 and U4/U5). The line's colour is red.

The U2 starts in the north at Feldmoching, where it connects to the S1 to Freising/Airport. The station there is decorated with rural and urban motives of Feldmoching's history. Below Hasenbergl, a district which had been known for its social problems, it goes to Dülferstraße, which provides access to the eastern Hasenbergl and a newly built area on Panzerwiese. Dülferstraße was the terminus from 1993 till 1996.

Via the stations Harthof and Am Hart, the U2 reaches Frankfurter Ring. In the tunnel between Am Hart and Frankfurter Ring, there is a white and blue wave pattern, which is the only installation of art in a Munich U-Bahn tunnel outside of stations.

After Milbertshofen station the U2 touches the U3 line at Scheidplatz, where cross-platform interchange is possible. Before the opening of the section to Dülferstraße in 1993,  U2 went from Scheidplatz to Olympiazentrum, sharing the track with the U3. Through the district of Maxvorstadt the U2 continues to downtown Munich, reaching the stations Hohenzollernplatz, Josephsplatz, Theresienstraße und Königsplatz. At Königsplatz one can find artworks from the nearby Glyptothek on the platform.

At München Hauptbahnhof (Munich Central Station), the U2 meets the U1, with which it shares tracks until Kolumbusplatz (see above).

After Kolumbusplatz the U2 continues eastward and reaches the stations Silberhornstraße, Untersbergstraße and Giesing Bahnhof, with an interchange possibility to S3 and S7. The next stations are Karl-Preis-Platz and Innsbrucker Ring, where cross-platform interchange to the U5 is possible. Until 1999, when the branch to the Messestadt stations was opened, the U2 ran from here to Neuperlach.

Via the stations Josephsburg and Kreillerstraße the U2 reaches Trudering, which features two platforms in separate tunnels, connected by two transversal tunnels. In 1994, during the construction of this section, an accident happened: the ceiling of the new tunnel collapsed due to the intrusion of water and a bus fell into the crater. Two passengers and one construction worker died and the construction was delayed.

Via Moosfeld, the U2 reaches Messestadt-West and its terminus Messestadt-Ost. These stations are located between the fairgrounds (Messestadt) in the north and a development area and the Bundesgartenschau 2005 in the south.

U3 

The U3 is the original Olympic line; the first section was opened for the Olympic Summer Games 1972. The line's colour is orange.

Today the U3 starts in the north at Moosach, Munich's 100th U-Bahn station, where you can change to the S1 to Freising/Airport. From here the line runs east to Moosacher St.-Martins-Platz and Olympia-Einkaufszentrum, where a change to the U1 is possible. After passing through Oberwiesenfeld station, the U3 reaches its original northern terminus at Olympiazentrum. From 1972 until 2010, this station was the end of the original Olympic line.

When Munich was awarded the Olympic Summer Games 1972 in 1965, the U-Bahn network concept (which was adopted only one year earlier) had to be revised to speed up the construction of a connection to the Olympic venues at Olympic grounds. The Olympic connector (now U3) was redesigned as a branch of the U6 line, because the original plan of a direct connection to the Olympic ground from Munich Central Station was not feasible in the shortness of time. This original U3 sections consists of four stations (from north to south): Olympiazentrum, Petuelring, Scheidplatz, where cross-platform interchange to the U2 (the line originally supposed to serve the Olympic venues) is possible since 1980, and Bonner Platz. After Bonner Platz the U3 reaches Münchner Freiheit, where it joins the U6 to run together through the inner city section to Implerstraße (for this section see U6 below).

After leaving the three-track junction station Implerstraße, where the U6 heads west towards Harras before ending up in Großhadern suburb, the U3 reaches Brudermühlstraße (near the picturesque Flaucher section of the Isar river), Thalkirchen (Zoo) (a short walk from the large city zoo) and Obersendling, which is built  higher than the Thalkirchen station, because it is located on the "Hochufer" (western tread) of the River Isar. Here, interchange to the S-Bahn at Siemenswerke station is possible.  The U3 continues west via Aidenbachstraße and Machtlfinger Straße, before reaching Forstenrieder Allee, Basler Straße, and eventually the terminus Fürstenried West. This southern-eastern section was opened on 28 October 1989, as can be seen from huge date numbers on the western entrance of Obersendling station.

U4 
With only  and 13 stations, the U4 is Munich's shortest U-Bahn line. This line has originally been planned as U9 and is the only line that operates regularly with 4-car sets rather than the full 6-car set. The exceptions are Fridays in the late afternoon and during the Oktoberfest. The line's colour is mint green.

The U4 begins in the west in the Laim neighbourhood at Westendstraße station, which it shares with the U5 line. Both U4 and U5 are the only lines of a joint line "family", which only branch out on one end of the common line, as an originally planned western extension of the U4 was first put on hold and was subsequently cancelled altogether.

From Westendstraße the U4 runs east to Heimeranplatz, which connects to S7 and S20 S-Bahn lines. The next two station, Schwanthalerhöhe (originally called Messegelände, the German for "exhibition grounds"; the name was changed when the exhibition centre relocated to Riem in 1998) and Theresienwiese, are gateways to the Oktoberfest, and are therefore highly loaded during this event. Between both aforementioned stations, there is a track that links to Implerstraße to provide a connection to the depot in Fröttmaning.

Theresienwiese is one of only two U-Bahn station in Munich (besides Fröttmaning station which serves Allianz Arena) to have the command centre booth that is opened during the Oktoberfest for supervising the masses of passengers. The south exit of the station leads to the northern entrance of Oktoberfest. U4 trains arriving from the east often terminate at Theresienwiese rather than continue to Westendstraße even during peak hours due to low traffic volume east of Hauptbahnhof.

After Theresienwiese the U4 reaches München Hauptbahnhof (Munich Central Station); passengers can transfer to U1/U2 lines as well as to all S-Bahn lines (except S20) here. The next station is Karlsplatz (Stachus) with shorter and easier connections to S-Bahn (S1 to S8). Karlsplatz is the deepest station in Munich's U-Bahn network ( below the surface). From this point on, the U4 runs north of the S-Bahn cross-city tunnel.

After passing Odeonsplatz, where an interchange to U3/U6 trains is possible, and Lehel, the U4 crosses the River Isar in a tunnel, and reaches Max-Weber-Platz, the last station that is shared with the U5. Here, the U4 branches off to the north, while the U5 runs south.

Before terminating at Arabellapark, the U4 passes the stations Prinzregentenplatz, Böhmerwaldplatz, and Richard-Strauss-Straße, the latter being the only station of the line to be equipped with side platforms instead of an island platform.

The original plan called for an extension to Johanneskirchen station (where easy transfer to the S8 S-Bahn line would be possible) via Fideliopark, but was never built, due to low current ridership in the area north of Max-Weber-Platz. The extension of the tram line in the area in 2011 made the plan even more unlikely to materialise. A possible extension in the west to Blumenau is even more improbable.

In the evenings from around 20.40 to the close of operations, the U4 only operates between Odeonsplatz and Arabellapark.

U5 

The line's signature colour is brown.

Via Friedenheimer Straße, the U5 reaches Westendstraße. From there, the U5 shares the tracks with the U4 to Max-Weber-Platz (see above).

At Max-Weber-Platz, the U5 branches off to the south to East Station (Ostbahnhof), where changing to all S-Bahn lines is possible. The next station, Innsbrucker Ring, allows cross-platform interchange to the U2.

The U5 continues south to Michaelibad, Quiddestraße, and Neuperlach Zentrum, which is the centre of the satellite town of Neuperlach, built during the 1960s and 1970s. Going on to Therese-Giehse-Allee, the U5 comes above ground and reaches its terminus Neuperlach Süd, where it allows cross-platform interchange with S-Bahn line S7. South-east of Neuperlach-Süd is a large parking yard (Betriebsanlage Süd) used to park trains which can't be parked at the technical base in Fröttmaning or within the network.

U6 

The U6 is the oldest U-Bahn line of the network and also features the oldest tunnel built: the section below the Lindwurmstraße (between Sendlinger Tor and including the station Goetheplatz) was already built 1938-1941 as part of a planned S-Bahn network. For this reason Goetheplatz has a platform longer than the standard . Its signature colour is blue.

Since 2006 the northern terminus of the U6 is Garching-Forschungszentrum; via Garching it reaches Garching-Hochbrück. These three stations are outside the city limits of Munich in the city of Garching

Fröttmaning has been expanded to two island platforms and four tracks to cater for the Allianz Arena football stadium, built for the 2006 FIFA World Cup. The technical base of the U-Bahn is located at Fröttmaning, too. After passing Kieferngarten station, which has two island platforms as well, it crosses over a rail bridge to Freimann and Studentenstadt. Between these two stations is a connection to mainline railway tracks, which is used to bring new trains into the network. The bridge was originally used by the tram and was the only tram track to be converted to be part of the U-Bahn network. The U6 then continues underground for the rest of its way south.

Via Alte Heide, Nordfriedhof (station with side platforms), and Dietlindenstraße, the U6 reaches Münchner Freiheit, where it joins the U3 on the shared inner city tunnel.

Passing Giselastraße and Universität (University), it arrives at  Odeonsplatz, where it connects to the U4/U5 lines. Continuing to Marienplatz, it crosses the S-Bahn lines. During peak hours this station is can get overcrowded, which is why additional pedestrian tunnels were built between 2003 and 2006.

At Sendlinger Tor the U3/U6 crosses the U1/U2 line, and interchange is possible. The line now uses the tunnel built in 1941 mentioned above as far as Goetheplatz. The next station, Poccistraße was added belatedly, constructed between the two existing tunnels which stayed operational. At Implerstraße the U3 and U6 separate again. To the north of the station, facing north, there is a branch to the U4/U5 at Schwanthalerhöhe, which is not used for passenger transport.

At Harras the U6 connects to the S-Bahn lines S7 and S27, and to regional trains to the south. The section via Partnachplatz and Westpark to Holzapfelkreuth was constructed for the Internationalen Gartenbauausstellung (IGA) in 1983 was therefore dubbed "flower line", which is reflected in the design of these stations. Passing Haderner Stern and Großhadern, the U6 reaches its current southern terminus at Klinikum Großhadern, where the entrance to the station is covered by a glass pyramid.

An extension to Martinsried, which is only approx.  west of the current terminus, is planned and agreed upon, and is supposed to open in 2026.

U7 

This new booster line (it only operates during rush hours) was added in December 2011 along with the new tram extension to St. Emmeram. The U7 runs between Westfriedhof and Neuperlach Zentrum via München Hauptbahnhof and Innsbrucker Ring: it shares the tracks with the U1 from Westfriedhof to Kolumbusplatz, the U2 from München Hauptbahnhof to Innsbrucker Ring, and the U5 from Innsbrucker Ring to its southern terminus Neuperlach Zentrum.

The stations along U7 line are Westfriedhof, Gern, Rotkreuzplatz, Maillingerstraße, Stiglmaierplatz, München Hauptbahnhof, Sendlinger Tor, Fraunhoferstraße, Kolumbusplatz, Silberhornstraße, Untersbergstraße, Giesing Bahnhof, Karl-Preis-Platz, Innsbrucker Ring, Michaelibad, Quiddestraße, and Neuperlach Zentrum.

U8 

This booster line started operations in December 2013. It only operates on Saturday afternoons. The U8 begins in the north at Olympiazentrum and shares the tracks with the U3 as far as Scheidplatz, where it continues along the U2 tracks to München Hauptbahnhof and terminates at Sendlinger Tor. It is only running on Saturdays to ease crowding on the U2 and U3 lines, and to provide people an easier access to the Olympic Park from Munich Central Station.

The stations along U8 line are Olympiazentrum, Petuelring, Scheidplatz, Hohenzollernplatz, Josephsplatz, Theresienstraße, Königsplatz, München Hauptbahnhof, and Sendlinger Tor.

Rolling stock 
Munich U-Bahn uses three different generations of electric multiple unit trains. The stock of over 550 carriages is shared between all lines.

Class A 

Class A trains were built between 1967 (prototypes) and 1983. The units consist of two carriages, which always remain coupled in normal operation. Each unit has three doors per side and a capacity of 98 seats and standing room for 192 passengers.
A total of 193 double-carriage units were delivered, of which 179 are still in use in Munich. Up to three A two-carriage units can be coupled together to form a 3/3 train (Langzug).

Class B 

Class B trains were built between 1981 and 1994 to provide more stock to service the growing network in the 1980s. As with the class A trains, six prototypes were ordered. However, it took six years until the series production started and the prototypes had to be modified to match the series-production units. B units have the same size as A units but differ in the design (especially of the front window) and use three-phase current instead of direct current motors. The other difference is the door opening mechanism. On B units, the passengers only need to pull just one handle to open both door leaves rather than both handles as on A units. Of a total of 63 units, 57 are still in service (including one prototype), and six have been scrapped.
As with A trains, up to three B double-carriage units can form a 3/3 train (Langzug). However, it is not possible to form a mixed train of A and B units, which are not compatible.

Class C 

Class C trains were designed in the late 1990s to gradually replace the Class A trains, which become more expensive to operate and maintain. Class C1 trains are six carriages attached together in one continuous length with gangways between the carriages, allowing the passengers to walk from one end to other. Ten trains, designated as C1.9 (Wagon No. 601–610), were ordered and delivered without prototype trains for evaluation. The technical difficulties delayed the entry into service to 2002. Eight more units, designated as C1.10 (Wagon No. 611–618), were delivered in 2005 prior to the 2006 FIFA World Cup. The total number of C1 trains in operation is 18.

A second generation, designated as Class C2, were ordered from Siemens Mobility in November 2010. They are based on new Siemens Inspiro subway trains. The first delivery of 21 units (C2.11) began in 2012 but was delayed until 2018 due to the technical defects and changes in federal and state regulations. The second order for 22 units (C2.12) was announced in 2019 with delivery commencing in 2020 and continuing until 2022. The third order for 24 units (C2.13) was placed in May 2020 for the delivery from 2022 to 2024. The total number of C2 trains in operation and under construction is 67.

Operation 
MVG has made lot of effort in the last few years to increase the frequency for trains on the busier lines (U1/U2/U7 and U3/U6) to five minutes between trains and to ten minutes on less busy lines (U4 and U8). The busier lines (U1/U2/U7/U8 and U3/U6) have "Langzug" (3 Class A/Class B trains or 1 Class C1/C2 trains). "Kurzzug" (short train) with 1 or 2 Class A/Class B trains are operated on less busy lines (U4/U5) or during less busy times in the evenings or weekends. During the Covid-19 pandemic in 2020, the "Kurzzug" has been temporarily removed from the service.

U3/U6 lines on shared tracks within city boundary has a notorious reputation of frequent service interruptions due to unanticipated technical issues, overcrowding, and passengers requiring medical attention or falling into the tracks at the stations. Additionally, U3/U6 lines receive frequent maintenance and track replacements due to heavier than anticipated passenger load. This necessitates the planning of new U9 line as to reduce the burden on U3/U6 line.

No 24-hour service is offered due to the nightly maintenance. Instead, the night buses are used.

History 
Already in 1905 there were plans to build an underground metro in about the route of today's trunk line of the S-Bahn between the main and Ostbahnhof and a ring road that surrounds the old town. Since these plans for the then traffic were clearly oversized, they came back into oblivion. The tram network was able to cover the traffic flows in the former half-million city. From 1910, the only 450 m long, automated Munich subway metro connected the main station with the post office on Hopfenstraße. It served only for the transport of letter post. In 1928 there were again plans to replace the trams in Munich by a subway network, but any such plans for this were thwarted the global economic crisis. A network of five subway routes, which had some similarities with today's route distribution, was to be realized.

At the time of Nazi Germany, from 1936, a network of electric subterranean railways was planned for the "capital of the movement" and construction was begun, but the Second World War put an end to this. The tunnel of today's U6 between Sendlinger Tor and Goetheplatz - including the station there - were already completed in the shell, but still as part of a rapid-transit railway route. This also explains the relative generosity of Goetheplatz (especially in the blockade entrance Goetheplatz does not fit the architecture today) and the narrowness of the present interchange station Sendlinger Tor on the platform U3 / U6. In the Lindwurmstraße took place on 22 May 1938, the groundbreaking ceremony for this tunnel, which should herald the beginning of the end of the tram. By 1941, the shell was completed, first railcars were to be delivered in the same year. The war-related scarcity of resources led to the cessation of this work. The shell was used during the war as an air-raid shelter, of which today still bears inscriptions on the tunnel walls.

Parts of the tunnel were filled with debris after the war, others served for a while as a breeding ground for mushrooms, before penetrating groundwater made the short piece of early metro history unusable. The Nazis forbade the acquisition of new rolling stock for the Munich tramways in order to show how "insufficient" the tram system was. At that time, trams were the primary means of public transportation in Munich. The Nazis made ambitious plans to change Munich into their "Reichshauptstadt der Bewegung" (Capital of the movement; the Nazi party had come to existence in Munich). This included the construction of an underground system. In the late 1930s, construction started in Lindwurmstraße and Sonnenstraße, where Munich's main Lutheran-Protestant church, Matthäuskirche, was torn down because it was supposedly a "traffic obstacle" (so was the Munich's main synagogue not far away as well as the tower of the Old Town Hall). Construction was abandoned in 1941 as World War II intensified. After the war, the priority was to reconstruct the badly-damaged tram system.

However, even during the 1950s the Munich City Council discussed plans to run a few of the tram lines underground because the capacity for surface traffic was overstretched. It planned four diameter lines (designation A, B, C, D), which divided the city into eight sectors and contained essential elements of today's network of lines. An east-west line "A": Pasing - Laim - Westend - Stachus (change in line "B") - Marienplatz (change in line "C") - Ostbahnhof - Berg-am-Laim. Another line "B": Moosach - Gern - Rotkreuzplatz - Stiglmaierplatz - Stachus (change in line "A") - Odeonsplatz - Max Weber Square - Bogenhausen - Zamdorf - Riem. A north-south line "C" was along Freimann - Münchner-Freiheit - Marienplatz (change in line "A") - Goetheplatz (already built 1938-1941 interchange station to the line "D") - Harras - Waldfriedhof planned. A north-south line "D" with the lines: Settlement am Hart - Scheidplatz - Elisabethplatz - Central Station - Goetheplatz (change to line "C") - Giesing.

In 1964 plans were, however, changed and it was decided to build a "real" underground network as follows:

U1: Moosach Bf – (Dachauer Str.) – Hbf – Goetheplatz – Kolumbusplatz – Giesing Bf – Neuperlach Zentrum 
U2: Amalienburgstr. – Rotkreuzplatz – Hbf – Goetheplatz – Kolumbusplatz – KH Harlaching – Großhesseloher Brücke 
U3: Heidemannstr. – Scheidplatz – Münchener Freiheit – Marienplatz – Goetheplatz – Fürstenrieder Straße – Blumenau 
U4: Pasing – Laimer Pl. – Heimeranplatz – Hbf – Theatinerstr. (Marienplatz Nord) – Max-Weber-Pl. – Arabellapark – St. Emmeram 
U5: Pasing – like U4 – Max-Weber-Pl. – Leuchtenbergring – St.-Veit-Str. – Waldtrudering 
U6: Kieferngarten – Münchner Freiheit – Marienplatz – Goetheplatz – Harras – Waldfriedhof – Großhadern 
U8: Hasenbergl – Am Hart – Scheidplatz – Theresienstr. – Karlsplatz (Stachus) – Sendlinger Tor (4. Stammstrecke) – Kapuzinerstr. (Kreuzungsbf mit U1/2) – Thalkirchen – Aidenbachstr. – Fürstenried West

Calls for a ring line of the subway were soon rejected, as this was the tangential passenger volume was too low, but you took in the construction of the S-Bahn trunk line at Rosenheimer Platz station consideration that should not be built the possibility of a crossing station here. Today, the tram takes on the most tangential traffic flows, the concept of a ring metro has been adopted.

Work started on 1 February 1965 at Nordfriedhof (North Cemetery) in Ungererstraße (now known as Schenkendorfstraße). Today a steel girder at the first building site is a monument to Munich's first underground railway. When the 1972 Summer Olympics were awarded to Munich in 1966, construction had to be sped up to get the "Olympic" line finished on time. On 8 May 1972 the line between Münchner Freiheit and Olympiazentrum ("Olympic line") to the venues of the Olympic Summer Games 1972 was opened, just 10 days after the Munich S-Bahn commenced operations. To satisfy demand during the Games, some DT1 trains were borrowed from Nuremberg. On 22 November 1975 the extension from Goetheplatz to Harras was opened. The network has been expanded continuously since 1980.

The activities of the U3 and U1 should be extended on a case-by-case. The beginning of the extension of U1, from Westfriedhof to Georg-Brauchle-Ring, opened on 18 October 2003, whereas another station, Olympia-Einkaufszentrum was later opened on 31 October 2004. Similarly, on 28 October 2007, the new era had resulted in U3, extending from Olympiazentrum, via Oberwiesenfield, to the Olympia-Einkaufszentrum, and later on it was extended to Moosach on 11 December 2010. This is a similar concept to the fictional U3 extension, which was achieved in 2007 and 2010 respectively.

The new Allianz Arena (football stadium) required a larger capacity of the nearby U-Bahn station at Fröttmaning. A new second platform was built and the whole station was moved north by roughly 100 metres (330 ft). For easy access to the platform, a second pedestrian bridge was built at the north end of the platforms. At the same year, U6 was extended on 14 October 2006 from Garching-Hochbrück to Garching-Forschungszentrum via Garching. This is a similar concept to the fictional U1 extension, where it had needed a new series of trains.

Timeline

Further extension plans

U1 (south): extension to Harlaching Hospital via Laurinplatz 
Although the plans for this extension were quite advanced, low passenger forecasts have led to its abandonment in favour of a tram or light rail from Schwanseestraße. But in 2015 and 2016, it was also announced that it will be extended to Solln.

U1 (north): extension to Feldmoching 
With this extension, the U1 line would terminate at S-Bahn and U2 subway stations in Feldmoching. The subway station, Olympia-Einkaufszentrum,  would be renamed as the Northern Cross. The extension is to connect with U2 line at current Hasenbergl subway station then continue to their terminus in Feldmoching. This plan was abandoned.

U2 (north): extension to Karlsfeld 
The city council of Bündnis 90 / Die Grünen and the CSU faction in the town council of Karlsfeld proposed the above-ground extension of the U2 from Feldmoching to Karlsfeld as a measure to relieve the municipality of the heavy car traffic. Moreover, this should provide a greater incentive for the employees of the large companies MAN and MTU to use public transport for their work. After initial investigations had shown a low cost-benefit ratio for this route, it was not cost-effective and was abandoned.

U3 (west): extension to Untermenzing 
This extension is planned after the U3 has been extended to Moosach, and it will go via Waldhornstraße.

U4 (east): extension to Englschalking Bahnhof 
This extension is considered in the third medium-term planning (Mittelfristprogramm) along with the plan of moving a portion of S8 line from surface to underground between Unterföhring and Leuchtenbergring stations. Whether the extension would be approved and when will it be built is not clear. The stations do include Cosimapark, Fideliopark, and Englschalking, all of which are in Bogenhausen.

U5 (west): extension to Pasing Bahnhof 
The Laimer Platz-Pasing extension has been approved on 14 July 2015 as to relieve the overburdened tram and bus routes serving the area between Laimer Platz and Pasing neighbourhoods. In case of S-Bahn disruption between Pasing Bahnhof and Ostbahnhof via Hauptbahnhof, the U5 can supplement the connection between both stations. The construction is to commence in 2021 at cost of 547 million euros and be completed in 2028-2029. Two new subway stations are Willibaldplatz and Am Knie. When completed, U5 will be only subway line in Munich to connect Hauptbahnhof with both west (Pasing) and east (Ostbahnhof) termini that provide regional and long-distance train services.

U5 (west): further extension to Freiham 
The residents called for the further extension of U5 to Freiham from Pasing Bahnhof. MVG initially rejected the proposal due to higher cost and two S-Bahn lines already serving the northern and southern areas of Freiham. Extending the tram line from Pasing Bahnhof to Freiham was considered as a cheaper alternative. On 17 July 2015, the citizen initiative and petition drive took place, supported by Christian Social Union (CSU) and Social Democratic Party (SPD) to extend U5 line further to Freiham. In January 2019, the city council passed the resolution to proceed with the further extension of U5 to Freiham. Due to the anticipated population growth, the subway line is more preferable than tram line in keeping up with the increasing demand. Additionally, the western terminus is to be located in Freiham city centre, serving the suburban town better than two S-Bahn lines in north and south.

On 26 January 2020, the city council approved the plan to extend the U5 further to Freiham with the construction commencing at the same time as the construction of Pasing Bahnhof subway station in 2021. The 750 million euros Pasing Bahnhof-Freiham extension is 4.5 kilometres long and has four new stations: Westkreuz, Radolfzeller Straße, Riesenburgstraße, and Freiham Zentrum. The date of completion is anticipated to be in 2035–2040.

On 28 July 2020, the administrative district of Oberbayern has approved the route alignment and construction plan for the second segment between the future subway stations Willibaldstraße and Am Knie. The second segment is routed from Willibaldstraße U-Bahnhof between Landsberger Straße and Agnes-Bernauer-Straße toward the two popular swimming, recreational, and sport centres (Westbad Hallenbad and Eis- und Funsportzentrums West). Am Knie U-Bahnhof will be located very close to the centres for quick and easy access.

The alignment and construction plan for third segment between Am Knie and Pasing subway stations are still under planning.

U5 (south): extension to Taufkirchen 
After the success of citizen initiative to extend the U5 West to Pasing and then to Freiham, the state parliament is exploring the extension south of Neuperlach Süd station to Taufkirchen. The extension would serve several important large-scale industries (including Ludwig-Bölkow-Systemtechnik and Airbus), the Bundeswehr military university, Technische Universität München Luft- und Raumfahrt-Fakultät (Aerospace Campus), and suburban towns (Neubiberg, Ottobrunn, and Taufkirchen).

The six-kilometre extension with four new stations is estimated to cost 300-400 million Euros, and the exact route hasn't been determined yet. Due to the cost factor, the extension would be built above ground since the tunnel costs approximately €80 million per kilometre. The Bavarian minister president, Markus Söder, is pushing for the large portion of federal funding, following the recent change in the outdated federal law, Gemeindeverkehrsfinanzierungsgesetz (Municipal Transportation Finances Act), to address the issues with cost factor analysis for the suburban regions and beyond.

No construction or completion date is given yet.

U6 (south): extension to Martinsried 
This  extension will serve a large biotech centre at Martinsried. The estimated cost in 2012 was €73.3 million: since the extension crosses the municipality boundary of Munich, the large percentage of funding (95%) comes from Free State of Bavaria while Planegg and Munich contributed smaller percentages. The planning was approved in 2013, and the anticipated completion date was 2014–2015. However, the extension must go through the contaminated area and former gravel pit later filled in, leading to the complications and delays in planning.

The parking garage at Martinsried station is being constructed now and to be completed at end of 2021. The construction of subway tunnel will start in 2022 with anticipated completion in 2026.

U6 (north): extension to Munich Airport 
This would be only U-Bahn line with direct access to the Munich Airport. At Hallbergmoos station, U6 would continue in parallel with S8 line to the airport and stop at both terminals before travelling further to Eching and Neufahrn. However, the plan was abandoned.

U9 and U29 bypass lines 

On 11 February 2014, SWM/MVG announced a detailed report for the construction of a new 10.5 km bypass line, a sixth intracity underground line, to be called the U9. The new line will relieve the overburdened U1/U2/U7/U8 and U3/U6 lines, especially the transfer stations at Sendlinger Tor (U1/U2/U7/U8 and U3/U6), Hauptbahnhof (U1/U2/U7/U8, U4/U5, and S-Bahn), and Odeonsplatz (U3/U6 and U4/U5), and will shorten the travel time between the Hauptbahnhof and the Allianz Arena by removing the need to transfer at Marienplatz or Odeonsplatz. MVG is predicting tremendous growth of passenger traffic in the northern section of Munich in the next twenty years and wants to plan accordingly.

The proposal was revised and approved in January 2018 to integrate the three major construction projects at Hauptbahnhof: the second S-Bahn tunnel and station, a new dedicated U9 platform, and the reconstruction of Hauptbahnhof. On 2 July 2019, funding for the U9 construction was approved, with most of the €3.5 billion to be provided by the federal government. The confirmed completion date is 2038 at latest.

The revised plan eliminates U6 service between Implerstraße and Münchner Freiheit to relieve the overburdened U3 and reduce the heavy congestion at Sendlinger Tor and Odeonplatz when transferring between lines during rush hour. The U9 takes over the current U6's southwestern (Klinikum Großhadern – Implerstraße) and northeastern (Münchner Freiheit – Garching-Forschungszentrum) extensions. The new stations would be Martinsried (a new extension west of Klinikum Großhadern), Esperantoplatz, Hauptbahnhof (dedicated platform), Pinakotheken, and Elisabethplatz. At Münchner Freiheit, the U9 is connected to the current U6 tracks to continue to its northeastern terminus at Garching-Forschungszentrum. A further plan to add a second spur to connect with the U2 line at Theresienstraße is planned. The second spur would be called U29: Klinikum-Großhadern – Hauptbahnhof – Theresienstraße – Harthof. This plan would extend the current U6 southwestern terminus from Klinikum-Großhadern to Martinsried.

Theresienwiese park has currently one subway station on site in the north but is served by two additional subway stations a few blocks away (U3/U6 - Goetheplatz in the southeast and U4/U5 – Schwanthälerhöhe in the west). Adding a second onsite subway station in the southeastern area would reduce the heavy Oktoberfest crowd at Theresienwiese station, especially during the closing time. Both stations would have direct connection to Hauptbahnhof without transferring. The name of second onsite station has not been officially determined yet, but the working title at moment is 2. Wiesnbahnhof. Esperantoplatz and Bavaria (in reference to the Bavaria statue nearby) have been suggested.

The museum quarter, Pinakothekenviertel, has one station, U2 – Königplatz, but it is inconveniently located in the southwestern quarter, requiring a long walk to several Pinakotheken museums. The new station, Pinakotheken, would be centrally located in the museum quarter and serve the museums and Technical University of Munich within a short walking distance. Pinakotheken would be served by tram lines, Tram 27 and 28, along with several local and crosstown bus lines. The plan will also facilitate the connection between Technical University of Munich and Campus Garching.

The plan called for the closure of the current Poccistraße and Implerstraße subway stations and construction of a new four-track station underneath the Südring, serving the U3, U9, and U29, and connecting to the new aboveground station serving regional trains and possibly the S-Bahn if the future S-Bahn-Ring is approved. The new U-Bahn station would be called Impler-/Poccistraße to differentiate it from the current U3/U6 – Implerstraße and Poccistraße stations. The current Poccistraße station has serious structural problems requiring expensive maintenance and extensive monitoring; it is cheaper to build a new station nearby than to continue using Poccistraße.

At Hauptbahnhof, the new dedicated U9 platform would be built underneath the current S-Bahn platform but above the U4/U5 platform. The platform would be located underneath the regional and long-distance train tracks between Holzkirchner Bahnhof (Holzkirchner wing station, serving southeastern Bavaria) and Starnberger Bahnhof (Starnberg wing station, serving southwestern Bavaria) with a new mezzanine level connecting the U9 platform with both wing stations and the rest of Hauptbahnhof. The advantage of locating the U9 platform in the western section of Hauptbahnhof is a quick transfer between platforms without a long, circuitous walk from one platform to other via the grand platform in the east.

On 3 July 2019, Deutsche Bahn announced the new "2. Stammstrecke — Die Optimierungen" (Second Trunk Line Optimisation). The State of Bavaria and the Munich city council want the first U9 station to be built at the Hauptbahnhof at the same time as the reconstruction of the Hauptbahnhof main building and the construction of the second S-Bahn trunk line. The design revision relocates the U9 platforms from the west end of the regional and long-distance platforms to the middle of the main Hauptbahnhof building below ground. The relocation places the U9 station directly above the second trunk line station in a cross arrangement. This improves the passenger flow between two current U-Bahn lines (U4/U5 and U1/U2/U7/U8), one current S-Bahn trunk line, and the above-ground level.

U26 tangent line 

Another proposal for crosstown travel in the north between U2 - Am Hart and U6 (or U9 when opened) - Kieferngarten is under consideration. This U26 would serve the people who live in the north and don't need to travel south in order to travel between northwest and northeast regions. The high cost and fewer stops as compared to tram line would make this proposal less feasible.

However, the new massive expansion plan for BMW's Forschungszentrum (Research Centre) in the north of BMW headquarter buildings and manufacturing plants would employ about 40,000 employees by 2050. The increased number of employees would lead to the vehicular traffic chaos and collapse unless the new S-Bahn North Ring and new U26 are built with stations at Forschungszentrum. The higher capacity of U26 and underground placement (without impacting the vehicular traffic) could make it more feasible and possible than tram line.

More booster lines 

Different booster lines have been discussed for years without any concrete plans.

 U10 Harthof - Münchner Freiheit - Odeonsplatz - Sendlinger Tor - Harras
 A third booster line, U10, would share U2 line between Harthof and Scheidplatz then switch to U3 line between Scheidplatz and Implerstraße before turning to U6 line at Harras. The northern and southern terminuses have not been determined yet.

 U11 Olympia-Einkaufszentrum - Westfriedhof - Central Station - Sendlinger Tor - Innsbrucker Ring 
 A fourth booster line, U11, would share U1 from Olympia-Einkaufszentrum to  Kolumbusplatz before switching to U2 line for the continued journey to Innsbrucker Ring station. Which terminus station, Messestadt Ost in the east or Neuperlach in the south, has not been determined.

 U12 Harthof - Theresienstraße - Hauptbahnhof - Theresienwiese - Implerstraße - Harras
 A fifth booster line, U12, would share with U2 between Harthof and Theresienstraße then switch to U9 south of Theresienstraße where it shares with U9 toward Harras.

Renovations and upgrades of subway stations 

Platform Screen Doors
Munich U-Bahn system is experiencing the increasingly frequency of passengers and objects falling from the platforms into the tracks lately, disrupting the service. The latest statistics showed for 2018 215 passengers falling in and being rescued, 22 seriously injured or dead, 115 objects, and 10 animals. MVG plans the pilot project at Olympiazentrum up to two years to test the feasibility and to resolve any issues before deploying system-wide technology. If these test at Olympiazentrum stations are successful, platform screen doors will be implemented in the high-frequency stations first then gradually and successively added to more stations when they are being renovated. The anticipated completion date of system-wide installation is 2028.

 Fröttmaning station (U6, North) — Completed

The new Allianz Arena (football stadium) required a larger capacity for the nearby U-Bahn station. For easy access to the platform, a second pedestrian bridge was built at the north end of the platforms.

 Marienplatz station (U3/U6) — Completed

The increase in traffic and the new Allianz Arena also required a larger capacity for this already overcrowded pivotal transfer station. New pedestrian tunnels were built, which provide more room for passengers transferring from and to the S-Bahn. They lie parallel to the existing platforms and are connected to them by 11 portals. At the south end, they meet the transverse tunnel, where the escalators to the S-Bahn platforms are located. To prevent Munich's historic town hall, located above the station and in between its two tunnels, from sinking in during the construction works, the ground surrounding the construction site had to be frozen over. The construction was completed in time for 2006 World Cup.

 Karlsplatz (Stachus) (U4/U5) — Completed

The two mezzanine levels and north entrance were renovated to include the enhanced fire protection and the updated interior. Due to the damage from humidity and water seepage, the structures of U4/U5 platforms were repaired and sealed up against further seepages.

 Münchner Freiheit (U3/U6) — Completed

The interior has been updated with horizontally corrugated metal wall covering in fluorescent yellow. The square support columns are decked in deep blue tiles with blue lights casting down, giving them blue hue. The ceiling is covered with mirrors, giving the "infinite" height. The mezzanine level had been updated with new white floor. The aboveground tram and bus station received the new organic-shaped covering roof. An interesting fact: prior to renovation, the name was spelled with extra "e" in "Münchener". After the completion, the name is now "Münchner Freiheit" eliminating the extra "e", reflecting the current spelling trend, as well as a "return" towards more traditional Bavarian habits of spelling and pronunciation. Thus, it precisely mirrors the spelling on the street signs above.

Plannings and in progress 
The original planners in the 1960s and 1970s did not envision the massive growth of passengers, increased number of subway lines, and continued extensions of current subway lines in the forthcoming years. Thus, they did not design the subway stations accordingly as to make them "future proof". The intersecting subway lines cause the overcrowding and frustrating movements between two station platforms, especially at Hauptbahnhof (U1/U2/U7/U8, U4/U5, and future U9 as well as S-Bahn), Sendlinger Tor (U1/U2/U7/U8 and U3/U6), and Odeonplatz (U3/U6 and U4/U5). The platform width and passage between stations and a fewer number of escalators were inadequate for larger number of people moving from one station to other as well as from aboveground to the underground during the rush hour.

 Sendlinger Tor station (U1/U2/U7/U8 and U3/U6) — Renovation In Progress
Due to poor design and unanticipated explosive growth of passenger traffic, Sendlinger Tor station has severe congestion and chokepoints for passengers moving between upper U3/U6 and lower U1/U2/U7/U8 platforms as well as upper levels (mezzanine and street). The €150 million renovation and upgrade of station was approved on 30 December 2015 by administrative district of Oberbayern. The project is scheduled to be completed in 2022 or 2023.

The U3/U6 platform has wide staircases and escalators connecting to the U1/U2/U7/U8 platforms below and mezzanine level above, and they created the narrow passageways on the platform. The narrow passageways lead to the dangerous chokepoints for passengers moving between the platforms or levels, especially during the rush hour. The U1/U2/U7/U8 platforms have only one corridor in the middle, connecting to the U3/U6 platform and upper levels. The combined landings of ascending and descending escalators and wide staircases from U3/U6 platform are placed too close to the U1/U2/U7/U8 platforms at either end of middle corridor. This causes the severe congestion during the rush hour when the passengers going downstairs must push through the passengers who are going upstairs.

The five lifts at the station do not connect directly to every level (two platform levels, mezzanine level, and street level). The two street level lifts are connected the mezzanine level only: they are located inconveniently further away from popular shopping street, Sendlinger Straße, requiring the passengers to cross the busy intersection to reach them. From the mezzanine level, the passengers either use two lifts to reach U1/U2/U7/U8 platforms or another lift to reach U3/U6 platform. If the passengers wish to transfer between upper and lower platforms via lifts, they must reach mezzanine level first and travel considerable distance to other lifts.

Additionally, the new EU safety directive 2016/798 requires additional fire protection in the subterranean train stations. Thus, installation of the partitions and doors that close automatically during the fire alarm at the landings of staircases and escalators.

The U1/U2/U7/U8 platforms have the new dedicated corridors built at north and south ends. The north corridor (Sonnenstraße-Verbindungstunnel) is connected to the mezzanine level: one set of escalators connecting to the mezzanine area and one staircase connecting to the lower landings of entrances A and B. The south corridor (Blumenstraße-Verbindungstunnel) is connected directly to the street level, bypassing U3/U6 platform or mezzanine level. Neither of them have the lifts. The north corridor has been opened to the public on 28 April 2020.

The middle corridor is being widened by eliminating the mechanical and storage rooms on one side. This allows the higher and better flow of passengers on either side of escalators and staircases. The current lifts, staircases, and escalators between U1/U2/U7/U8 platforms and mezzanine remain unchanged.

The floors of both upper and lower platforms are being raised five centimeters to line up with the subway carriage's floor for barrier-free and stepless access with wheelchairs, prams, walkers, stroller, etc. The tactile tiles for the passengers with visual disabilities are installed for the first time at Sendlinger Tor station. It is unclear whether the lifts are being renovated and extended to reach all lower levels from the street level without transferring at mezzanine level.

The escalators between U1/U2/U7/U8 and U3/U6 platforms are being rearranged as to improve the flow while the wide staircases are eliminated.

The bilevel mezzanine area is being renovated with one section rebuilt and levelled to eliminate the small stairs and narrow ramp, which interrupt the flow. The interior is to have blue and yellow colours, giving the station a bright and airy feel. The small shops, food vendors, and service centres will be installed close to the completion.

 Hauptbahnhof (U4/U5) — Planned
On 23 February 2020, MVG announced a new project to reconstruct U4/U5 platform at Hauptbahnhof for improved passenger movement between U1/U2/U7/U8 platforms below and mezzanine level above. One of the proposals called for installation of footbridge above U4/U5 platform that are connected at several points by unidirectional escalators and smaller lifts. No construction start date has been given. This coincides with megaproject of reconstructing Hauptbahnhof building and construction of new second S-Bahn trunk line and third U-Bahn line. This coincides with the megaprojects of rebuilding the Hauptbahnhof aboveground and of building second S-Bahn station and new U9 station.

Network map

See also 
 List of Munich U-Bahn stations
 Munich S-Bahn
 Munich Tramway
 List of metro systems

Notes

References

External links 

Munich Verkehrsgesellschaft
Pictures of the Munich U-Bahn
Munich U-Bahn Map

 
Underground rapid transit in Germany
1971 establishments in West Germany
Railway lines opened in 1971
750 V DC railway electrification